Senator Lambert may refer to:

Benjamin Lambert (1937–2014), Virginia State Senate
Gary Lambert (politician) (born 1959), New Hampshire State Senate
John Lambert (politician) (1746–1823), U.S. Senator from New Jersey from 1809 to 1815
Kent Lambert (fl. 1970s–2010s), Colorado State Senate
Paul Lambert (Nebraska politician) (born 1950), Nebraska State Senate